Memorial Hermann Hospital/Houston Zoo Station is an island platformed METRORail light rail station in Houston, Texas, United States. The station was opened on January 1, 2004, and is operated by the Metropolitan Transit Authority of Harris County, Texas (METRO). The station is located at the intersection of Fannin Street and Cambridge Street and serves Memorial Hermann Hospital, the Medical School portion of The University of Texas Health Science Center at Houston and the Houston Zoo. Ben Taub Hospital and Baylor College of Medicine are also within walking distance of the station.

References

METRORail stations
Railway stations in the United States opened in 2004
2004 establishments in Texas
Texas Medical Center
Railway stations in Harris County, Texas